This article documents expected notable spaceflight events during the year 2027.

NASA plans to launch Dragonfly, a robotic rotorcraft probe which will explore Saturn's moon Titan.

China plans to launch the eXTP X-ray observatory.

Orbital launches 

|colspan=8 style="background:white;"|

June 
|-

|colspan=8 style="background:white;"|

To be determined 
|-

|}

Suborbital flights 

|}

Deep-space rendezvous

Extravehicular activities (EVAs)

Orbital launch statistics

By country 
For the purposes of this section, the yearly tally of orbital launches by country assigns each flight to the country of origin of the rocket, not to the launch services provider or the spaceport. For example, Soyuz launches by Arianespace in Kourou are counted under Russia because Soyuz-2 is a Russian rocket.

By rocket

By family

By type

By configuration

By spaceport

By orbit

References

External links

 
Spaceflight by year